HMS Repulse was a 74-gun third-rate ship of the line of the Royal Navy, launched on 22 July 1803 at Deptford.

In 1805, Repulse took part in the Battle of Cape Finisterre. In 1807 the ship served in the Mediterranean squadron under Vice-Admiral John Thomas Duckworth and Vice-Admiral Harry Riddick during the Dardanelles Operation and the Alexandria expedition of 1807.

She was broken up in 1820.

Notes

References

 Lavery, Brian (2003) The Ship of the Line - Volume 1: The development of the battlefleet 1650–1850. Conway Maritime Press. .

External links
 

Ships of the line of the Royal Navy
Repulse-class ships of the line
1803 ships